The following lists events that happened during 1949 in Laos.

Incumbents
Monarch: Sisavang Vong 
Prime Minister: Boun Oum

Events

July
1 July - The Royal Lao Army is founded to defend against Viet Minh attacks.

References

 
1940s in Laos
Years of the 20th century in Laos
Laos
Laos